The Ferrovie dello Stato Italiane (FS; Italian State Railways) Class 290 (Italian: Gruppo 290), formerly the Rete Adriatica Class 350 bis, is a 0-6-0 steam locomotive.

Design and construction

The Class 290 was a development of the earlier Class 270 locomotives, studied under the Rete Adriatica; it kept the wheelbase, but replaced the boiler with a slightly bigger one, with a minimally coned rear ring. Its construction was continued under the new FS management, which made it one of its twelve standard designs; it was the last and most successful 0-6-0 Italian locomotive.

The class was built by several Italian and foreign manufacturers, between 1899 and 1913.

The first 112 locomotives were classified as Class RA 350 bis (with running numbers between 3631 and 3742); of these, 52 were taken over by the FS in July 1905 upon formation, while the other 60 were taken over by the new Strade Ferrate Meridionali (Southern Railways), a rump of the RA, until its incorporation with the FS in July 1906.

Service

The class saw widespread service on the Italian network, with the first members of the class being sent to work as helpers on the steep lines around Fabriano and Sulmona.

Some locomotives were withdrawn relatively early, but as many as 60 were still active after World War II; however, their activity ceased by the end of the 1950s.

Preservation

The last member of the class to remain active, the 290.319, survived into preservation; it is currently kept in the Pietrarsa railway museum.

References

 
 

0-6-0 locomotives
290
Gio. Ansaldo & C. locomotives
Railway locomotives introduced in 1899
Standard gauge locomotives of Italy
Costruzioni Meccaniche di Saronno locomotives